Roques may refer to:

Places
 Roques, Gers, a commune in France
 Roqués, an uninhabited village in Spain
 Roques, Haute-Garonne, a commune in France
 Roques de Anaga, two monuments of Tenerife, Canary Islands, Spain
 La Roque-d'Anthéron, a commune in the Bouches-du-Rhône department in southern France
 Los Roques archipelago, a federal dependency of Venezuela
 Los Roques Airport, a small domestic airport on the El Gran Roque island in the Los Roques archipelago
 Roques, a small village in Aveyron, France

Other uses
 5643 Roques, a Main-belt asteroid

People with the surname Roques
 Claude Roques (born 1912), French field hockey player 
 Clément-Emile Roques (1880-1964), French Cardinal of the Roman Catholic Church
 Jacques Roques, Swiss aviator
 Guillaume-Joseph Roques (1757–1847), French painter
 Léon Roques (1839–1923), French transcriber 
 Pierre Roques (1856–1920), French general
 Serge Roques (born 1947), French politician
 Tony Roques (born 1978), English rugby union football player

See also
 Roque (disambiguation)
 Rocks (disambiguation)
 ROCS (disambiguation)
 ROKS (disambiguation)

French-language surnames